Bakalia Government High School, formerly known as Bakolia Government Laboratory High School, is a government co-educational institution located in Bakalia thana, Chattogram, Bangladesh. The school was established in 1967. The architectural design of Bakalia Government High School and the   Nasirabad Government Boys' High school is done by the same the same architect; more over both government schools were built in the same year 1967. Boys and girls are split into two separate shifts in the school. Girls attend school in the morning shift while boys attend their classes starting from noon, which is known as day shift. The school has 32 teachers and more than 1580 students. It ranked 19th in the results of the 2015 Secondary School Certificate (SSC) examination in Chattogram Board; in the 2017 results, it was 9th among the top ten schools in the board.
In 2020, Bakalia Government High School has ranked 6th among top 10 schools of Chattogram in Secondary School Certificate exam.

History
The school was established in 1967 during Pakistani rule. After the independence of Bangladesh in 1971, the school came under the control of the government of Bangladesh.

See also
 Aparnacharan City Corporation Girls' High School
 Dr. Khastagir Government Girls' School
 Chittagong Collegiate School and College
 Saint Placid's High School
 Nasirabad Government High School

References

Schools in Chittagong
High schools in Bangladesh
Public schools in Chittagong